Harry Watson may refer to:
Harry Watson (actor) (1921–2001), American actor, photographer and television journalist
Harry Watson (artist) (1871–1936), English landscape and portrait artist
Harry Watson (Australian footballer) (1896–1941), Australian rules footballer for Fitzroy
Harry Watson (cyclist) (1904–1996), New Zealand cyclist
Harry Watson (footballer, born 1908) (1908–1982), English footballer
Harry Watson (ice hockey, born 1898) (1898–1957), amateur ice hockey player fl. 1920s
Harry Watson (ice hockey, born 1923) (1923–2002), professional ice hockey player fl. 1940s and 1950s
Harry Watson Jr. (1876–1965), American actor and comedian
Harry Davis Watson (1866–1945), British Army officer
Harry L. Watson, American historian and author
Harry T. Watson (1882–?), American college football, basketball and baseball player and coach

See also
Harold Watson (disambiguation)
Henry Watson (disambiguation)